The climate of Southeast Brazil is quite diverse in temperature. This is due to the latitudinal position around the Tropic of Capricorn, the very uneven topography, and disturbed circulation systems which greatly influence the climatology of the region.
 

Vast areas of Minas Gerais and São Paulo register occurrences of frosts, after the passage of the polar fronts.

As far as the incidence of rain is concerned, there are two areas with heavy precipitation: one following the coast and the Serra do Mar, where the rains are precipitated by the southerly currents; and the other from the west of Minas Gerais to the Municipal district of Rio de Janeiro, where the rains are brought by the Westerly system. In the Serra da Mantiqueira these indexes surpass , and at the summit of Itatiaia, .

The maximum pluviometric index of the Southeast area usually occurs in January and the minimum in July, while the dry period is usually concentrated in the winter, lasting six months in the case of the valleys of the rivers Jequitinhonha and São Francisco, to as little as two months in the Serra do Mar and Serra da Mantiqueira.

Charts of selected cities

External links 
 https://web.archive.org/web/20101206014542/http://www.brazil.org.uk/brazilinbrief/climate.html

Southeast